Abdul Baqi Baryal was an Afghan legislator. He came to serve to represent Ghazni Province in Afghanistan's Meshrano Jirga, the upper house of its National Legislature, in 2005.
Abdul Baqi Baryal is a member of the Pashtun
ethnic group.
He was injured by a rocket during the Soviet occupation of Afghanistan, losing a leg and his vision. He was a refugee in Pakistan until 2002.
He founded an organization for disabled people when he lived in Pakistan. He is a poet, and the editor of the magazine Bright Heart.

References

Politicians of Ghazni Province
Living people
Members of the House of Elders (Afghanistan)
Afghan refugees
Pashtun people
Afghan expatriates in Pakistan
Year of birth missing (living people)
Afghan people with disabilities